PGLang (stylized as pgLang, an acronym for Program Language) is an American entertainment company founded by Kendrick Lamar and Dave Free in 2020. The multidisciplinary company comprises a record label, film and television production houses, management and advertising agencies, and publishing services. PGLang was launched on March 5, 2020, and is headquartered in Los Angeles.

History
PGLang was founded on April 25, 2019, by American rapper Kendrick Lamar and American filmmaker Dave Free. The creative partners met when they were both in high school, and have directed music videos together under the collective name the Little Homies. On October 4, Rolling Stone reported that Free left his position as co-president of independent record label Top Dawg Entertainment (TDE), and was "working on his own" for several months while helping rapper Baby Keem with his career.

On March 5, 2020, Lamar and Free formally launched PGLang, which was described as a "multilingual, artist-friendly, at service company". The company's mission statement reads:

An accompanying visual mission statement, starring Lamar, Keem, singer-songwriter Jorja Smith, and actress Yara Shahidi, was released on the same day. In a separate press release, Free clarified that PGLang "is not a record label, a movie studio, or a publishing house. This is something new. In this overstimulated time, we are focused on cultivating raw expression from grassroots partnerships." Lamar simply stated in the press release, "Selfless. Reset."

On January 13, 2021, PGLang announced an advertising campaign for fashion house Calvin Klein, with a series of seven short films written and directed by Free. The short films included appearances from Keem, singer Brent Faiyaz, movement artist Mecca Allah, rapper Travis "Taco" Bennett, and influencer Amber "Jstlbby" Wagner, among others. On August 20, Lamar announced through a blog post that he was in the process of producing his final studio album under TDE. Keem released his debut studio album, The Melodic Blue, on September 10 through PGLang and Columbia Records, marking the company's first studio album release. 

On January 13, 2022, Deadline reported that Lamar and Free were producing a live-action comedy film with South Park creators Matt Stone and Trey Parker. On March 9, PGLang announced the signing of rapper Tanna Leone in a partnership with Def Jam Recordings. Leone released his debut studio album, Sleepy Soldier, on April 27. On May 2, the company collaborated with lifestyle brand Converse on an advertising campaign and sneaker collection. Lamar released his fifth studio album, and final project under TDE, Mr. Morale & the Big Steppers on May 13. To promote the album. he embarked on the Big Steppers Tour, which was presented by PGLang and sponsored by Cash App and Amazon Music. The company collaborated with Cash App for an advertising campaign on August 14, and with Amazon Music for a concert film on October 22.

Roster

Discography

Studio albums

Filmography

Films

Music videos

Campaigns

References

2019 establishments in California
Advertising agencies of the United States
American companies established in 2019
American hip hop record labels
Clothing companies of the United States
Companies based in Los Angeles
Entertainment companies based in California
Film distributors of the United States
Film production companies of the United States
Kendrick Lamar
Mass media companies established in 2019
Music production companies
Music publishing companies of the United States
Privately held companies based in California
Record labels based in California
Record labels established in 2019
Talent agencies
Television production companies of the United States